(Eng: Irresponsible Hero) is the ninth single released by the Japanese boyband Kanjani8. The single was the first that featured three separate versions since the release of Kan Fu Fighting. The two limited edition singles featured different B-side tracks and DVDs of their unit and band performs from the 2009 Summer Concert tour. The regular edition featured one B side.

This single was released during the height of the 2008 American Presidential Election and the hidden gag for the single was biting off of the then Democrat Presidential Nominee Barack Obama craze that had hit Japan. Band member Ryuhei Maruyama played a campaigning politician in the promotional video and was featured inside the regular edition CD jacket.

"Musekinin Hero" is currently the group's most successful single, out performing the success of "Kan Fu Fighting" in just first week sales alone. The song managed to be the 11th top selling single in 2008 despite its late year release.

Track listing

Regular Edition
 " Musekinin Hero "
 " Michishirube "
 " Musekinin Hero <Original Karaoke> "

Limited Edition A
 " Musekinin Hero "
 " Kemuri "
 " ∞o'clock 08 "

DVD
fuka fuka love the earth
BJ

Limited Edition B
 " Musekinin Hero "
 " fuka fuka love the earth "

DVD
Desire
Subaru Shibutani/Shota Yasuda Unit
Torn
Tadayoshi Okura/Ryo Nishikido Unit
Hoshi mono wa
You Yokoyama/Ryuhei Maruyama/Shingo Murakami Unit

Charts

References

2008 singles
Kanjani Eight songs
Oricon Weekly number-one singles
2008 songs
Song articles with missing songwriters